The 1992 Orlando mayoral election was held on September 1, 1992 to elect the mayor of Orlando, Florida. It saw the election of Glenda Hood.

Municipal elections in Orlando and Orange County are non-partisan.  Had no candidate received a majority of the votes in the general election, a runoff would have been held between the two candidates that received the greatest number of votes.

Results

References

1992
1992 Florida elections
1992 United States mayoral elections
1990s in Orlando, Florida